Turn Off the Stars was a Canadian pop rock band based in Toronto, Ontario. The band's name is taken from a Bill Evans song. Their atmospheric, anthemic songwriting has been compared to Britpop artists such as Coldplay, Doves and Keane. The band has toured nationally in the US and Canada, and has opened for Switchfoot, April Wine and The Tea Party. The band has also played in London, Ontario.  The band played their final show in June, 2009.

Discography

Albums
Turn Off the Stars - Credential Recordings (2006)

EPs
Everything Is OK - Curve Music (2004)

Compilations
Stereocilia Vol. 1 - Credential Recordings (2006)
The Tour EP - Credential Recordings (2007)

References

External links
Turn Off the Stars at MySpace
Official PureVolume

Musical groups established in 2004
Musical groups disestablished in 2009
Musical groups from Toronto
Canadian indie pop groups
Credential Recordings artists
2004 establishments in Ontario
2009 disestablishments in Ontario